Coxswain William P. Brownell (July 12, 1839 – April 26, 1915) was an American soldier who fought in the American Civil War. Brownell received the country's highest award for bravery during combat, the Medal of Honor, for his action  aboard the  during the Battle of Grand Gulf on 2 May 1863 and the Siege of Vicksburg at New Bern on 22 May 1863. He was honored with the award on 16 April 1864.

Medal of Honor citation

See also

List of American Civil War Medal of Honor recipients: A–F

References

1839 births
1915 deaths
People of New York (state) in the American Civil War
Union Navy officers
United States Navy Medal of Honor recipients
American Civil War recipients of the Medal of Honor